is a Japanese manga series written and illustrated by Kei Sanbe. The manga is licensed in English by CMX Manga. The manga is licensed for a French-language release by Vegetal Soleil.

Characters
Garrincha is the feared inquisitor of Neo Arsen. He tries to convert heretics to the Arsenal religion.
Leonedus is a loyal friend of Garrincha.
Capria is a nun who joins the group.
Socrates is the healer and doctor of the group.
Sabati is an assassin who betrayed Arsenal to join Materia, a heretic sect. She attempts to assassinate Leonedus, her childhood friend.

Manga
Kadokawa Shoten has released four tankōbon volumes of the manga between March 2001 and November 2002. CMX Manga released the four bound volumes of the manga between September 1, 2005, and May 1, 2006.

Volume listing

Reception

Mania.com's Jarred Pine criticises the manga on relying too much on " flashy violence rather than really exploring the conflicts of the heretic inquisitions."

References

External links

2001 manga
Action anime and manga
CMX (comics) titles
Fantasy anime and manga
Historical anime and manga
Kadokawa Shoten manga
Kei Sanbe
Shōnen manga